The Belgian football league system is a series of interconnected leagues for club football in Belgium.

Men's system
The league system underwent restructuring which was approved by the Royal Belgian Football Association. One important step was the introduction of a national fifth level for the first time. Its implementation took effect as of the 2016–17 season. Due to the COVID-19 pandemic, the Belgian First Division A has expanded temporarily from 16 to 18 teams, with the intention to return to 16.

Pre-2016 structure
Until the end of the 2015–16 season, the structure was as follows. For each division, its official name, sponsorship name (which often differs radically from its official name) and number of clubs is given. The winner(s) of each division promoted to the division(s) directly above them and relegated to the division(s) that lie directly below them.

Men's league historical timeline
The timeline below lists the evolution of the men's tiers and leagues related to the Belgian FA since 1895. The provincial leagues often span multiple tiers.

Women's system
From 2012/13 to 2014/15 the top teams played in the BeNe League, a joint league with clubs from the Netherlands. The Super League was created in 2015.

References

External links
 League321.com - Belgian Football League Tables, Records & Statistics Database.
Belgian Football League summary(flashscore)

 
Belgium